The 1998 United States Senate election in Vermont was held November 3, 1998. Incumbent Democratic U.S. Senator Patrick Leahy won reelection to a fifth term.

Notably, the Republican nominee, dairy farmer and actor Fred Tuttle, had run to draw attention to the mock documentary film Man with a Plan, of which he was the star, and to ridicule Republican candidate Jack McMullen as too new to Vermont to represent it in Washington.  After winning the nomination, Tuttle endorsed Leahy and all but withdrew from the race.  His campaign, which had been conducted primarily from his front porch in Tunbridge, Vermont, spent only $251 during the election season and featured the slogans "Spread Fred!" and "Why Not?". Despite his endorsement of Leahy, Tuttle still received 48,051 votes, or 22% of the total.

Democratic primary

Candidates 
 Patrick Leahy, incumbent U.S. Senator

Results

Grassroots primary

Candidates 
 Bob Melamede

Results

Republican primary

Candidates 
 Fred Tuttle, dairy farmer and actor
 Jack McMullen, businessman

Campaign 
McMullen had maintained a vacation home in Warren, Vermont beginning in 1983, and he made Vermont his permanent residence beginning in 1997.  

In 1998, he declared his candidacy for the Republican nomination for U.S. Senator.  As related by Chris Graff, longtime Vermont bureau chief for the Associated Press, McMullen's candidacy sustained an immediate blow when Graff interviewed retired Senator Robert Stafford about the January 1998 ice storm and other current events.  During the discussion, Stafford persistently got McMullen's name wrong, calling him "Mulholland".  Graff wrote that he tried to politely correct Stafford, but finally realized that Stafford's intent was to convey his opinion that McMullen was too unknown and too new to Vermont to be a viable candidate.  The lede in the resulting story was that Vermont's senior Republican was of the view that McMullen had not lived in the state long enough to represent it in the senate, and Stafford's dismissal of McMullen as "Mulholland or whatever his name is" became a running joke among reporters and political operatives.

In the Republican primary, McMullen faced Fred Tuttle, a retired dairy farmer who had starred in a mock documentary film called Man with a Plan, a comedy about a retired farmer who decides to run for Vermont's seat in the United States House of Representatives.  Tuttle and filmmaker John O'Brien considered using a Tuttle candidacy to promote the film, and accepted a suggestion from political columnist Peter Freyne to challenge McMullen rather than incumbent Congressman Bernie Sanders.  Tuttle then ran in the Republican U.S. Senate primary, partly to generate awareness of the movie, and partly to mock McMullen as a carpetbagger and flatlander (Vermont slang for an out-of-stater) who had moved to Vermont only because he thought it would be easier to run for the Senate there than in more populous Massachusetts.  McMullen was slow to recognize that the Tuttle/O'Brien strategy was viable; when the McMullen campaign challenged Tuttle's nominating petitions as 23 short of the required 500 signatures, Tuttle turned in an additional 2,300.

During a debate before the primary, Tuttle underscored McMullen's newness to Vermont.  One question he posed to McMullen was "What's a tedder?" (A machine for drying hay.)  Another was "What's rowen?" (The second cutting of hay from the same field in one season.)  Tuttle continued with queries like "How many teats a Holstein got?"  (Four; McMullen guessed six.)  Tuttle then provided McMullen a list of local place names and asked him to pronounce them.  McMullen's inexperience with Vermont geography showed, as he mispronounced names including Leicester (Lester is correct), Calais (callous being the correct way), and Charlotte (shar-LOT, not Shar-Lit).

The campaign made national headlines, and added to Tuttle's semi-celebrity status.  Despite McMullen spending over $500,000 to Tuttle's $200, on primary day, Tuttle beat McMullen 28,355 votes to 23,321 (55 percent to 45).  Tuttle immediately announced his intention to vote for incumbent Democratic Senator Patrick Leahy, after which the two made several joint appearances.  On election day, Leahy defeated Tuttle and several minor candidates to win reelection.

Results

General election

Candidates

Major 
 Patrick Leahy (D), incumbent U.S. Senator
 Fred Tuttle (R), dairy farmer and actor (dropped out before election)

Minor 
 Hugh Douglas (L)
 Jerry Levy (LU)
 Bob Melamede (GR)
 Barry Nelson (I)

Results

See also 
 1998 United States Senate elections

References

Sources

United States Senate
Vermont
1998